The Continental Tyres Irish Car of the Year award was established in 1978 based on similar Car of the Year awards. It is organised and judged by the Motoring Media Association of Ireland (MMAI), comprising journalists across the country. The award was initially sponsored by Semperit and more recently by Semperit's owners, Continental Tyres.

The awards have eleven categories: Irish Car of the Year (overall winner), Compact Car, Medium Car, Large Car, Compact SUV, Medium SUV, Large SUV, Green/Efficient Car, Performance/Luxury Car, Hot Hatchback, and, since 2019, MPV.

Ford has won the competition eight times, with the Ford Mondeo winning the overall title the most times for an individual model. The winner for 2023 was the Volkswagen ID. Buzz. The awards ceremony is usually held each November in Dublin, with the awards presented for the following year. The awards ceremony for 2023 was held at the Westin Dublin Hotel.

Current rules
Cars are assessed by a jury of 34 of the most experienced motoring journalists in Ireland. Each jury member road tests every car individually on the following criteria:

 use of new technology/new ideas
 safety factors
 equipment level, fuel economy, practicality
 environmental impact (emissions, recyclability)
 use of space, comfort, ventilation and layout
 build quality, fit and finishing
 ride, dynamic qualities, road holding, steering, manoeuvrability
 engine, ease of driving, braking
 price, warranty, dealer network, after sales service
 driver/user feedback

Results
The first winner of the award was the Volkswagen Golf Diesel, which debuted four years after the regular Volkswagen Golf. 

The Ford Mondeo is the only model to have won the title three times, in 1994, 2008 and 2016. It was beaten into second place in 2001 by the Renault Laguna. 

The 2023 winner was the Volkswagen ID. Buzz with the van version, the ID. Buzz Cargo, winning the Irish Van of the Year title.

By manufacturer

See also
 Car of the Year
 List of motor vehicle awards

References

External links
Irish Car of the Year Website
Irish Motoring Writers Association

Motor vehicle awards
Road transport in Europe